Arsak may refer to:

alternative transliteration of Artsakh, see Artsakh (disambiguation)
Ashk (given name), an ancient male given name
Arshak, an Armenian given name
Arsaces, Greek form of Arshak

See also
Arsac, a commune in France